Pedairffordd Halt railway station (alternatively Pedair-Ffordd Halt) was a station on the Tanat Valley Light Railway, located 1.3 miles south of Llanrhaeadr-ym-Mochnant, Powys, Wales in the hamlet Pedair-Ffordd. The station opened in 1904 and closed in 1951. There station was located on the east side of a level crossing.

References

Further reading

Disused railway stations in Powys
Railway stations in Great Britain opened in 1904
Railway stations in Great Britain closed in 1951
Former Cambrian Railway stations